Peter Dayan  is director at the Max Planck Institute for Biological Cybernetics in Tübingen, Germany. He is co-author of Theoretical Neuroscience, an influential textbook on computational neuroscience. He is known for applying Bayesian methods from machine learning and artificial intelligence to understand neural function and is particularly recognized for relating neurotransmitter levels to prediction errors and Bayesian uncertainties. He has pioneered the field of reinforcement learning (RL) where he helped develop the Q-learning algorithm, and made contributions to unsupervised learning, including the wake-sleep algorithm for neural networks and the Helmholtz machine.

Education
Dayan studied mathematics at the University of Cambridge and then continued for a PhD in artificial intelligence at the University of Edinburgh School of Informatics on statistical learning supervised by David Willshaw and David Wallace, focusing on associative memory and reinforcement learning.

Career and research
After his PhD, Dayan held postdoctoral research positions with Terry Sejnowski at the Salk Institute and Geoffrey Hinton at the University of Toronto. He then took up an assistant professor position at the Massachusetts Institute of Technology (MIT), and moved to the Gatsby Charitable Foundation computational neuroscience unit at University College London (UCL) in 1998, becoming professor and director in 2002. In September 2018, the Max Planck Society announced his appointment as a director at the Max Planck Institute for Biological Cybernetics in Tübingen.

Awards and honours
Dayan was elected a Fellow of the Royal Society (FRS) in 2018. He was awarded the Rumelhart Prize in 2012 and The Brain Prize in 2017.

See also
 Helmholtz machine

References

Alumni of the University of Edinburgh
Living people
Jewish scientists
Rumelhart Prize laureates
Fellows of the Royal Society
1965 births
Alumni of the University of Cambridge
Max Planck Institute directors
Academics of University College London